Aurelio "Dong" Dueñas Gonzales Jr. (born October 27, 1962) is the congressman of the 3rd District of Pampanga in the Philippines. He was formerly a member of Lakas-Kampi-CMD but switched to PDP–Laban in the 2016 Philippine general elections.

Gonzales was born and raised in Brgy. Anao in the town of Mexico, Pampanga. He was married to Elizabeth Panlilio Gonzales and together they share a son named Brenz (after the late Governor Bren Z. Guiao). Elizabeth was among the victims killed in the 2017 Resorts World Manila attack on June 2, 2017.

Before becoming a congressman, he was a board member for the same district for one term before running for Congress and winning against Dinan Labung and Tiger Lagman.

He ran for representative in the 2013 elections and received a total of 108,275 votes.

He was one of the signatories of House Resolution 1109 calling for a constituent assembly to amend the Constitution.

Personal life
He has five children named Aurelio III, Aurelio Brenz who is a Civil Engineer, Aurelio Michaeline, Michael Aurelio and Alyssa Michaela.

References 

http://ph.rappler.com/people/dong-gonzales

External links 
Hon. Aurelio "Dong" D. Gonzales, Jr. - Republic of the Philippines House of Representatives

1962 births
Living people
Members of the House of Representatives of the Philippines from Pampanga
Deputy Speakers of the House of Representatives of the Philippines
Members of the Pampanga Provincial Board
Mapúa University alumni
Filipino engineers
Filipino civil engineers
Kapampangan people